Hegang No.1 High School (Chinese: 鶴崗市第一中學, pinyin: Hègǎng shì dìyī zhōngxué) is a public high school in Hegang, China. It was established in March 1950.

References
鹤岗一中学校简介

Educational institutions established in 1950
High schools in Heilongjiang
1950 establishments in China